Amur State University is a university in Blagoveshchensk, Amur Oblast, Russia.  is associated with the history of the Amur Region. Blagoveshchensk Technological Institute was founded on the basis of Blagoveshchensk Technical Faculty in 1975. At that moment it was the first institute of light industry in the Far East. In 1992 Blagoveshchensk Technological Institute was renamed into Blagoveshchensk Polytechnical Institute. Two years later the Polytechnical Institute developed into a full-fledged multidisciplinary university; the Amur State University.

Faculties 
 Mathematics and Computer Science
 Physical engineering
 International Relations
 Design and technology
 Social Sciences
 Philology
 Economy
 Energy
 Law
 Pre-university courses
 Professional development and professional retraining
 STR
 General Lyceum (grades 5–11)

External links

 Official website of Amur State University

Universities and institutes established in the Soviet Union
Buildings and structures in Amur Oblast
Universities in the Russian Far East
Blagoveshchensk
Technical universities and colleges in Russia